Steinunn Þóra Árnadóttir (born 18 September 1977) is an Icelandic politician. She is a member of the Left-Green Movement.

Political career
Steinunn Þóra has a BA in Anthropology and an MA in Disability Studies, both from the University of Iceland. She has been active within the MS-Society of Iceland and the Organization of Disabled in Iceland. Steinunn Þóra has been active within the Left-Green Movement for a number of years, including taking a place on the party's ticket in five parliament elections; 2007, 2009, 2013, 2016 and 2017.

When Árni Þór Sigurðsson resigned from parliament on 18 August 2014, Steinunn Þóra took a permanent seat as his replacement, representing Reykjavík North Constituency. She currently sits on the Committee of Education.

Personal life
She is married to the historian and politician Stefán Pálsson. The couple have two sons and are members of Ásatrúarfélagið.

References 

Steinunn Thora Arnadottir
Living people
1977 births
Steinunn Thora Arnadottir
Steinunn Thora Arnadottir
Adherents of Germanic neopaganism